A local election  was scheduled to be held in the Mexican state of Colima on Sunday, July 5, 2009. Voters went to the polls to elect, on the local level:

the Governor of Colima
municipal presidents (mayors) to serve for a three-year term.
Local deputies to serve for a three-year term in the Congress of Colima.

Gubernatorial election
Both national parties and one local party contested the gubernatorial election.

Mario Anguiano Moreno was elected Governor with 50.9% of the vote.

References

External links
Electoral Institute of Colima website

2009 elections in Mexico
Election